Krampe is a German language surname. Notable people with the name include:
 Florian Krampe (born 1980), German-Swedish political scientist
 Hans-Dieter Krampe (1937–2019), East German footballer
 Hugh Charles Krampe (1925–2016), American actor and humanitarian

See also 
 Kramp

References 

German-language surnames